This is a list of autopistas, or tolled (cuota) highways, in Mexico. Tolled roads are often built as bypasses, to cross major bridges, and to provide direct intercity connections.

Many federal highways corridors numbers cover more than one autopista; other federal highways do not have limited access sections. Normally, Mexican federal highways that are on toll roads have the letter suffix "D" for Directo, e.g. Fed. 45 is free (libre) and Fed. 45D is toll (cuota). Most autopistas have a toll  over all or part of their length. A few autopistas in very mountainous areas are two-lane.

The Mexican limited access highway network is the largest in the Americas outside the USA. Toll plazas along the mainline charge tolls anywhere from MXN $20 to $300, or US$1 to $15. Plazas, crossing the border, accept either pesos or U.S. dollars, but after leaving border city limits one must pay in pesos.

List of autopistas

References
Secretaría de Comunicaciones y Transportes, Informe de Rendición de Cuentas de la Administración Pública Federal, 2000-2006, p. 132 
SCT official autopista list and toll table as of April 2017

Autopistas
Mexican autopistas, List of